Antara Dev Sen (born 1963) is an Indian journalist based in Delhi.

Biography
Antara was born in Cambridge, England and did her schooling in Delhi and later in Kolkata and higher education in India (Kolkata) and United States. Sen also studied at Jadavpur University, Calcutta, Smith College in Massachusetts, United States and at Harvard University.  She then joined the Hindustan Times. As a senior editor of the Hindustan Times, she went to Oxford University on a fellowship from the Reuters Foundation.  She has also worked with the Ananda Bazaar Patrika Group in Calcutta and with The Indian Express in Delhi, where she was senior assistant editor.

On her return to Delhi, she started The Little Magazine and was its founding editor. The magazine predominantly publishes articles on literary themes relating to South Asia. She is also a literary critic and translator, a newspaper columnist and commentator on the media, society, politics, culture and development. She has edited several books including the TLM Short Stories from South Asia series.

Sen is also managing trustee of Pratichi, a trust working on education and health. Further, she is a Guest Editor at Indian Literature, Sahitya Akademi's bimonthly English journal.

References

External links

The Little Magazine
openDemocracy
Words Without Borders

1963 births
Living people
People from Cambridge
Smith College alumni
Harvard University alumni
Alumni of the University of Oxford
Amartya Sen
Writers from Kolkata
Indian women editors
20th-century Indian journalists
21st-century Indian women writers
21st-century Indian writers